Pallanza is a district of the Italian comune (municipality) of Verbania. It is located in the Province of Verbano-Cusio-Ossola, on the bank of Lake Maggiore.

History 
Pallanza was autonomous until 1939 when it was merged with Intra to form Verbania under the royal decree n. 702 of 4 April 1939.

Pallanza hosted the 1906 European Rowing Championships.

References

Municipalities of the Province of Verbano-Cusio-Ossola
Populated places on Lake Maggiore